Muhammad Zahid Ahmadzai is a politician and diplomat from Afghanistan who is the member of Leadership Council of Afghanistan. He also served as Diplomat and Third Secretary to Taliban Embassy of Pakistan.

References 

Taliban government ministers of Afghanistan
Year of birth missing (living people)
Living people